Below is a list of Finnish language exonyms for places in non-Finnish-speaking areas:

Note that the Finnish language inflects place names where English use prepositions like in and to. These variants can affect any place name and are inflections, not exonyms. For example Mene Birminghamiin means Go to Birmingham.

General 
Foreign place names containing a direction such as South or Upper are often translated, e.g.:

North Carolina → Pohjois-Carolina; Upper Volta → Ylä-Volta

Belgium

China

Cuba

Cyprus

Denmark

Egypt

Estonia
Estonian and Finnish are quite closely related and share many words that differ only slightly, such as saar (Estonian) and saari (Finnish) for island. Many Estonian toponyms and even people's names are simply translated into Finnish as if they were Finnish words, creating an unlimited number of potentially existing exonyms. Below are only some frequently encountered examples of these, as well as those where the difference is significant.

Finland

The Swedish names for the above are commonly (if not exclusively) used in modern-day Finnish. Korsnäs in Ostrobothnia should not be confused with other locations in Finland with the same name (see Korsnäs (disambiguation)).

Areas with both Finnish-, and Swedish-speaking inhabitants have endonymic place names in both languages. Due to changing demographics, some monolingually Swedish areas have historical Finnish names inherited from earlier Finnish-speaking inhabitants. For example, Molpe, a village of Korsnäs is Moikipää in Finnish.

France

Germany

Greece
Ancient transcriptions that do not reflect modern pronunciation are used in some cases, e.g. Herakleion ("Iraklion").

Iran

Israel

Italy

Latvia

Lebanon

Lithuania

Norway
For further names, see : Finnish exonyms for places in Norway

Poland

Portugal

Romania

Russia

Note that Finnish was formerly an official language in the Republic of Karelia and is still widely used there, and some places in what was Finnish territory until World War II have been given new Russian names; thus, Finnish names of Karelian places are not all strictly exonyms.

Saudi Arabia

Serbia

South Africa

Spain

Sweden
Northern Sweden has a Finnish/Meänkieli-speaking minority and thus some place names are derived from Finnish, making them not exonyms.

Switzerland

Syria

Turkey

Ukraine

United Kingdom

United States

See also
List of European exonyms

References 

Lists of exonyms
Exonym